The New Mexico State Aggies men's basketball team represents New Mexico State University in Las Cruces, New Mexico. Founded in 1904, the Aggies currently compete in the Western Athletic Conference and last played in the NCAA Division I men's basketball tournament in 2022. The Aggies are one of 34 college basketball teams with multiple NBA retired jerseys from former players (Sam Lacey and John Williamson) and a team that reached the NCAA Final Four (in 1970). The team plays home games in the Pan American Center.

A Lou Henson-coached team gained national attention during the 1970 NCAA Division I men's basketball tournament by advancing to the Final Four. In 1992, a Neil McCarthy-coached team advanced to the Sweet Sixteen, though that appearance has since been vacated. Aggie Basketball has seen 25 NCAA tournament appearances, 5 NIT Tournament appearances, 19 regular season conference championships, and 12 conference tournament championships.

History
NMSU Basketball has seen much success throughout the years, reaching the NCAA Final Four in 1970, the Sweet Sixteen in 1992 among their 23 tournament appearances. Their two most successful coaches were Lou Henson and Neil McCarthy.

Jerry Hines era (1929–1940, '46)
Jerry Hines was an outstanding two-sport athlete, the head basketball and head football coach, and the athletic director.  During the later 1930s, the Aggie football team was 31–10–6 and the basketball team was 102–36 under Hines. The Aggie basketball team went to several postseason tournaments during this time, including the 1938 NAIA Division I men's basketball tournament, and the 1939 NIT tournament in New York City. The Hines era ended at the onset of World War II when he was called to duty in September 1940 as a member of a New Mexico National Guard unit assigned to the 45 Infantry Division. Hines did return for one more Aggie basketball season in 1946–47.

Lou Henson era (1966–1975)
Lou Henson played for the Aggies in the 1950s, coached at Las Cruces High School, and came from Hardin-Simmons University to become the head coach. His tenure was the most successful in Aggie history. His 1970 team reached the NCAA tournament Final Four, losing to a John Wooden-coached and eventual champion, UCLA.

Henson led the Aggies to the NCAA tournament in six of his nine years. He left in 1975 for a successful 21-year run at Illinois.

Neil McCarthy (1985–1997)
Neil McCarthy came to Las Cruces in 1985 following a successful 10-year run at Weber State.  He had built Weber State into a regional power, and was equally successful at New Mexico State.  For most of McCarthy's tenure, the Aggies were the second-best team in the Big West, behind UNLV.  McCarthy led the Aggies to four straight regular season and tournament titles, including the 1992 Sweet Sixteen run.

Academic Scandal 
The 1992 Sweet Sixteen run, along with two other NCAA runs in the early 1990s, was scrubbed from the books in 1996 when the NCAA found several players from that team received help on correspondence courses from a coach. Six Aggie players were found to have received help. Without those courses, the players would not have been eligible.

The McCarthy era came to a sudden and abrupt end just weeks before the 1997–98 season when new athletic director Jim Paul stripped him of coaching duties, citing the team's poor academic performance.  Only nine of McCarthy's players had graduated in 12 years, including only one in the last four.  McCarthy was originally supposed to serve as an assistant athletic director for the balance of his contract, but instead sued NMSU for wrongful termination—a move that would come back to haunt the school later.

In 2000, the Aggies were rocked again by a scandal from the McCarthy era.  McCarthy had promised to hire a junior college coach as an assistant coach in return for bringing two of his top players to Las Cruces.  That coach, Fletcher Cockrell, helped the two players with coursework and exams.  The school placed the basketball program on two years' probation and withdrew from postseason consideration during the 2000–01 season.  The NCAA imposed an additional four years' probation and forced the Aggies to vacate McCarthy's last season and the first season of Henson's second stint.  The NCAA said that the penalties would have been even harsher if the school's former president, the former athletic director and McCarthy had still been at the school.

Lou Henson's 2nd run (1997–2004)
Henson was lured from retirement to coach the team on an interim basis for the 1997–98 season after McCarthy's ouster. He initially came back because he wanted to help the Aggies during their search for a new head coach. Henson wanted to donate his time, but state law forbade him from coaching the program for free.  He ultimately settled for $1 per month. The following season Henson agreed to stay on as head coach on a permanent basis, leading the Aggies back to the NCAA tournament in 1999.

Henson continued to coach the Aggies until being sidelined by non-Hodgkin lymphoma prior to the 2004–05 season. Due to Henson's illness the Aggies were led that year by assistant coach Tony Stubblefield, who guided the squad to a dismal 6–24 record, by far the school's worst season in twenty years. Henson officially announced his retirement from coaching in January 2005, and Stubblefield remained interim head coach for the remainder of the season.

Reggie Theus (2005–2007)
On March 31, 2005, NMSU hired 13-year NBA veteran Reggie Theus, then an assistant at Louisville under Rick Pitino, as head men's basketball coach. In his first season, Theus turned the Aggies from a 6–24 squad in 2004–05 to a 16–14 team in the 2005–06 season as the Aggies moved from the Sun Belt Conference to the Western Athletic Conference. In Theus's second year the Aggies finished the regular season at 22–8, won the WAC Tournament on their home floor, and earn an automatic bid to the 2007 NCAA tournament. Following the tournament Theus left NMSU to take over the head coaching position of the NBA's Sacramento Kings.

Marvin Menzies (2007–2016)
Marvin Menzies was named as Theus' successor, and like Theus before him, came to NMSU after having been an assistant to Pitino and had no previous Division I head coaching experience. In 2010 the Aggies again won the WAC Tournament and advanced to the NCAA tournament, falling 70–67 in the first round to eventual Final Four participant Michigan State. In 2012 the Aggies once again advanced to the NCAA tournament by winning the WAC Tournament for the third time in six seasons. They continued to appear in the NCAA tournament through 2015. After their 2016 NIT tournament appearance, Marvin Menzies was hired to take over the Nevada-Las Vegas (UNLV) basketball program.

Paul Weir (2016–2017)
Paul Weir served in the role of associate head coach from July 2011 until he was promoted to head coach on April 26, 2016.  He helped the Aggies to five WAC Tournament Championships (2010, 2012–2015) and five NCAA tournament appearances. The Aggies have collected three WAC Championships during Weir’s tenure. The Aggies have won back-to-back WAC regular season titles in 2015 and 2016 after collecting their first WAC regular season title in 2008. Overall, NM State has collected seven WAC titles during his nine years with the program. Weir left after one season to coach the New Mexico Lobos, a rival of the Aggies.

Chris Jans (2017–2022)
Former Bowling Green head coach Chris Jans was named the new head coach of the Aggies on April 17, 2017. He had been serving in an administrative role at Wichita State after being fired from BGSU in 2015 and was promoted to associate head coach of the Shockers just 4 days prior to being hired by NMSU. In his first season at NMSU, The Aggies won 28 games for the second year in a row, and won both the WAC regular season title and conference championship to advance to the NCAA tournament, where they lost to Clemson in the first round. In 2022 New Mexico State won a first round NCAA tournament game against University of Connecticut, before losing to Arkansas. Jans was hired by Mississippi State after the 2022 season.

Greg Heiar (2022–2023) 
Greg Heiar was named the head coach of the Aggies on March 28, 2022. He was formerly the head coach at Northwest Florida State College, where he won the 2022 NJCAA Men's Division I Basketball Championship.  On February 14, 2023, Greg Heiar was removed as the head coach of New Mexico State men's basketball team due to hazing allegations.

Season by season results

* — Overall record includes tournament and postseason results; Regular–season conference record and place contained in parentheses.

** — Forfeit by Lamar University on Jan. 6, 2022, is not included in overall record, but is included in conference record.

Coaches

The Aggies have had 27 coaches in their 110-year history. Six Aggie coaches have been named conference Coach-of-the-Year: Lou Henson in 1975, Ken Hayes in 1977, and Weldon Drew in 1983 in the Missouri Valley Conference; Neil McCarthy in 1989 and 1990 in the Big West Conference; Marvin Menzies in 2015, and Chris Jans in 2018, 2019 and 2020 in the Western Athletic Conference.

Postseason Results

NCAA tournament
The Aggies have appeared in 26 NCAA tournaments. Their combined record is 11–27.

From 2010 to 2015 the round of 64 was known as the second round

NCAA tournament seeding history
The NCAA began seeding the tournament with the 1979 edition.

NAIA tournament
The Aggies have appeared in four NAIA Tournaments. Their combined record is 5–4.

National Invitational tournament
The Aggies have appeared in the National Invitation Tournament (NIT) five times. Their combined record is 2–5.

Aggies of note

Ring of Honor
New Mexico State's men's basketball Ring of Honor stands as a tribute to individual players and coaches that are distinguished as Aggie legends.  A player's number is retired upon reaching this milestone. A banner designating this honor is hung from the rafters in the Pan American Center.

Lou Henson – began his coaching career with the Aggies in 1966, eventually coaching the Aggies to 289 victories over 17 years. Henson finished with 779 victories including his wins at Illinois. Henson coached the Aggies to the Final Four and two Sweet Sixteens among the 10 NCAA tournament appearances. His career Aggie record is 289–152, which is the winningest in Aggie history.

Sam Lacey (#44) – played for the Aggies from 1967 to 1970, including a trip to the Final Four. Lacey is 11th in Aggie all-time scoring and holds most rebounding records. He was a 1st Team All-American in 1970 and played in the NBA for 13 seasons, well enough to get his #44 jersey retired by the Sacramento Kings.

Billy Joe Price (#31) – played from 1957 to 1961, including two trips to the NCAA tournament. Price is 15th on the all-time scoring list and among the career leaders in rebounding.

Jimmy Collins (#22) – played for the Aggies from 1967 to 1970 and helped them to the Final Four in 1970. Collins holds the Aggie season scoring record and rank 3rd all-time in career scoring. Collins played in the NBA for several seasons.

John Williamson (#24) – is the most prolific scorer in Aggie history, averaging over 27 points per game during the 1971–72 and 1972–73 seasons. Williamson played for the New York/New Jersey Nets and won two ABA championships. His #23 jersey is retired by the Nets.

Jerry Hines – was the Aggie basketball coach, as well as football coach, during the 1930s.  The Aggies advanced to the NIT Tournament in 1938. His career record is 157–108, which is third winningest in Aggie history.

Honored players
These Aggies have been honored by either induction in the New Mexico State Athletics Hall of Fame, or recognized as an All-American, or recognized as conference player of the year.

Honored coaches
These Aggie coaches have been honored by either induction in the New Mexico State Athletics Hall of Fame, or recognized as conference coach of the year.

Honored contributors
These Aggie contributors have been honored by induction in the New Mexico State Athletics Hall of Fame

Awards

All-American
 Charlie Criss – 1969 (UPI First Team "Small Men")
 Sam Lacey – 1970 (Basketball News First Team)
 Jimmy Collins – 1970 (Helms First Team, USBWA First Team, Converse First Team)
 John Williamson – 1972 (Basketball News First Team)
 James Moore – 2003 (AP Honorable Mention)
 Daniel Mullings – 2014 (AP Honorable Mention)
 Pascal Siakam – 2016 (AP Honorable Mention)
 Ian Baker – 2017 (AP Honorable Mention)
 Jemerrio Jones – 2018 (AP Honorable Mention)

All-District
 Sam Lacey – 1970
 Jimmy Collins – 1970
 Albert 'Slab' Jones – 1979
 Jaime Pena – 1982
 Sam Crawford – 1993
 Rodney Walker – 1995
 James Moore – 2003
 Justin Hawkins – 2007, 2008
 Jahmar Young – 2009, 2010
 Troy Gillenwater – 2011
 Wendell McKines – 2012
 Daniel Mullings – 2014, 2015
 Pascal Siakam – 2015, 2016
 Ian Baker – 2017
 Jemerrio Jones – 2018
 Zach Lofton – 2018
 Trevelin Queen – 2020
 Teddy Allen – 2022

All-Stars
 Sam Lacey – 1970 (NABC Coaches All-Star)
 Jimmy Collins – 1970 (NABC Coaches All-Star)
 Roland Grant – 1974 (Liberty Bell Classic MVP)
 Richard Robinson – 1977 (NABC Coaches All-Star)
 Randy Brown – 1991 (NABC Coaches All-Star, Japan Classic)
 Sam Crawford – 1993 (NABC Coaches All-Star)
 Rodney Walker – 1995 (Final Four Slam Dunk Contest)

Academic All-American
 Eric Channing – 2000, 2001, 2002

Conference Coach of the Year
 Lou Henson – 1975 (MVC)
 Ken Hayes – 1977 (MVC)
 Weldon Drew – 1983 (MVC)
 Neil McCarthy – 1989, 1990 (Big West)
 Marvin Menzies – 2015 (WAC)
 Chris Jans – 2018, 2019, 2020 (WAC)

Conference Player of the Year
 James Moore – 2003 (Sun Belt)
 Daniel Mullings – 2014 (WAC)
 Pascal Siakam – 2016 (WAC)
 Ian Baker – 2017 (WAC)
 Jemerrio Jones – 2018 (WAC)
 Teddy Allen – 2022 (WAC)

All-Conference First Team (1935 to 1983)
 A.F. 'Hooky' Apodaca – 1935, 1936, 1937 (Border)
 Lauro Apodaca – 1937 (Border)
 Kiko Martinez – 1938, 1939 (Border)
 Pecos Finley – 1938 (Border)
 Joe Jackson – 1938, 1939 (Border)
 Morris Wood – 1938, 1939 (Border)
 Otis Shows – 1940 (Border)
 Marvin Hoover – 1940, 1941 (Border)
 David Sharp – 1948 (Border)
 Jim Tackett – 1951, 1952 (Border)
 Bob Priddy – 1952 (Border)
 Mike Svilar – 1952 (Border)
 Jim Loomis – 1956 (Border)
 Wayne Yates – 1958 (Border)
 Robert Jarrett – 1958 (Border)
 Billy Joe Price – 1959, 1961 (Border)
 George Knighton – 1960, 1961, 1962 (Border)
 Vincent Knight – 1960 (Border)
 Roland Grant – 1974 (MVC)
 Richard Robinson – 1975, 1977 (MVC)
 Jim Bostic – 1975 (MVC)
 Albert 'Slab' Jones – 1978, 1979, 1980 (MVC)
 Jaime Pena – 1982 (MVC)
 Ernest Patterson – 1983 (MVC)

All-Conference First Team (1984 to Present)
 Steve Colter – 1984 (Big West)
 Gilbert Wilburn – 1986 (Big West)
 Kenny Travis – 1987 (Big West)
 Johnny Roberson – 1989 (Big West)
 Keith Hill – 1990 (Big West)
 Randy Brown – 1990, 1991 (Big West)
 Reggie Jordan – 1991 (Big West)
 Sam Crawford – 1993 (Big West)
 James Dockery – 1994 (Big West)
 Rodney Walker – 1995 (Big West)
 Louis Richardson – 1997, 1998 (Big West)
 Charles Gosa – 1999 (Big West)
 Billy Keys – 2000 (Big West)
 Eric Channing – 2001 (Big West); 2001, 2002 (Sun Belt)
 James Moore – 2003, 2004 (Sun Belt)
 Justin Hawkins – 2007, 2008 (WAC)
 Jahmar Young – 2009, 2010 (WAC)
 Troy Gillenwater – 2011 (WAC)
 Wendell McKines – 2012 (WAC)
 Bandja Sy – 2013 (WAC)
 Daniel Mullings – 2014, 2015 (WAC)
 Pascal Siakam – 2015, 2016 (WAC)
 Ian Baker – 2017 (WAC)
 Jemerrio Jones – 2018 (WAC)
 Zach Lofton – 2018 (WAC)
 Terrell Brown – 2019 (WAC)
 Ivan Aurrecoechea – 2020 (WAC)
 Jabari Rice – 2020 (WAC)
 Teddy Allen – 2022 (WAC)

Conference Tournament MVP
 Sam Crawford – 1992 (Big West)
 James Dockery – 1994 (Big West)
 Billy Keys – 1999 (Big West)
 Justin Hawkins – 2007 (WAC)
 Jahmar Young – 2010 (WAC)
 Wendell McKines – 2012 (WAC)
 Sim Bhullar – 2013, 2014 (WAC)
 Tshilidzi Nephawe – 2015 (WAC)
 Ian Baker – 2017 (WAC)
 Jemerrio Jones – 2018 (WAC)
 Trevelin Queen – 2019 (WAC)
 Teddy Allen – 2022 (WAC)

Conference Freshman/Newcomer of the Year
 Albert 'Slab' Jones – 1977 (MVC)
 Robert Gunn – 1978 (MVC)
 Jaime Pena – 1981 (MVC)
 Charles Gosa – 1996 (Big West)
 James Moore – 2001 (Sun Belt)
 Sim Bhullar – 2013 (WAC)
 Pascal Siakam – 2015 (WAC)
 Teddy Allen – 2022 (WAC)

Aggies in the National Basketball Association
Bill Allen – Anaheim, ABA, 1967–68
Sim Bhullar – Sacramento, NBA, 2014–15
Jim Bostic – Detroit, NBA, 1977–78
Randy Brown – Sacramento, Chicago, Boston, Phoenix, NBA, 1991–2003
Jimmy Collins – Chicago, NBA, 1970–72
Steve Colter – Portland, Chicago, Philadelphia, Washington, Sacramento, Cleveland, NBA, 1984–91; 1994–95
Charlie Criss – Atlanta, San Diego, Milwaukee, NBA, 1977–85
Mike Dabich – Oakland, Dallas, ABA, 1967–68
Jonathan Gibson – Dallas, Boston, NBA, 2016–18
Jemerrio Jones – Los Angeles Lakers, NBA, 2019–Present
Reggie Jordan – Los Angeles Lakers, Atlanta, Portland, Minnesota, Washington, NBA, 1993–94; 1995–2000
Sam Lacey – Cincinnati, Kansas City, New Jersey, Cleveland, NBA, 1970–83
Zach Lofton – Detroit, NBA, 2018–Present
Bob Priddy – Baltimore, NBA, 1952–53
Pascal Siakam – Toronto, NBA, 2016–Present
John Williamson – New York, ABA/NBA; Indiana, New Jersey, Washington, NBA, 1973–81

Famous Aggies
Players and coaches that had notable success before or after their time as an Aggie player or coach.
Reggie Theus (2005–07, coach) – 14 year NBA career, coach of NBA Sacramento Kings, 2x NBA All-Star, #23 jersey retired by UNLV, assistant to Rick Pitino at Louisville (404 Wikilinks)
Pascal Siakam (2014–16) – NBA Champion (2019), NBA All-Star (2020), All NBA 2nd Team (2020), NBA Most Improved Player (2019), 2nd round NBA Draft pick (270 Wikilinks)
Lou Henson (1953–55; 1966–75 & 1997–2005, coach) – 2x Final Four coach, coach at Illinois (1975–96), College Basketball Hall of Fame (241 Wikilinks)
Randy Brown (1989–91) – 3x NBA Champion (1996–98), 12 year NBA career, 2nd round NBA Draft pick (169 Wikilinks)
Sam Lacey (1967–70) – 14 year NBA career, #44 jersey retired by Royals/Kings organization, NBA All-Star (1975), 1st round NBA Draft pick (162 Wikilinks)
Gary Ward (1959–62) – Oklahoma State baseball coach (1978–96) (159 Wikilinks)
John Williamson (1971–73) – 2x ABA Champion (1974, 1976), #23 jersey retired by the Nets organization, 11 year ABA/NBA career (128 Wikilinks)
Rob Evans (1966–68) – Ole Miss and Arizona State head coach (112 Wikilinks)
Jimmy Collins (1967–70) – Illinois-Chicago coach, assistant to Lou Henson at Illinois (108 Wikilinks)
Charlie Criss (1967–70) – 12 year NBA career (91 Wikilinks)

Aggies in international leagues

Jahmar Young (born 1986), basketball player in the Israeli National League

All-Time Statistical leaders

1000 Point Club
The 1000 Point Club consists of Aggies who have eclipsed 1000 points scored in their career.  This is a notable accomplishment in college basketball.  There are 35 Aggies that have reached this mark.

† = official records stricken
‡ = active player

Other Statistics

References

External links
Basketball Reference